Achistrum is an extinct genus of sea cucumber which existed in Poland during the Triassic period, and the United States during the Carboniferous period. It contains the species Achistrum nicholsoni and Achistrum ludwigi.

References

Apodida
Carboniferous echinoderms
Triassic echinoderms
Fossils of Poland
Fossil taxa described in 1881